The Netherlands will compete at the 2022 European Championships in Munich from August 11 to August 22, 2022.

Medallists

Competitors
The following is the list of number of competitors in the Championships:

Athletics

Beach Volleyball

Netherlands has qualified 4 male and 3 female pairs.

Men

Women

Cycling

Road

Men

Women

Track

Sprint

Team sprint

Qualification legend: FA=Gold medal final;
 Athlete who participated in the qualification round only.

Time trial

Individual Pursuit

Team pursuit

Scratch

Points race

Elimination race

Gymnastics

Netherlands has entered five male and five female athletes.

Men

Team event

Individual finals

Women

Team event

Individual finals

Triathlon

Men

Women

Mixed

References

2022
Nations at the 2022 European Championships
European Championships